Laurențiu Cosmin Buș (born 27 August 1987) is a Romanian professional footballer who plays as a midfielder.

Club career
Buș started his career at Universitatea Cluj. In the 2003–04 season he was promoted to the first team.

Buș impressed Politehnica Timișoara's manager, Gheorghe Hagi, who transferred him in the summer of 2006. Soon after that, Gheorghe Hagi was replaced by Sorin Cârţu and Laurențiu Buș was sent to the club's second team, Politehnica Timișoara II.

In 2007 Buș returned to U Cluj and helped the team gain promotion to Liga I. In the summer of 2009 he was transferred to Arieşul Turda. In January 2010 he signed with FC Oţelul Galaţi.

International career
Buș played several matches for the Romanian national under-19 team.

Personal life
Buș's younger brother, Sergiu, is also a professional footballer.

Honours
Universitatea Cluj
Liga II: 2006–07

Oțelul Galați
Liga I: 2010–11
Supercupa României: 2011

CS Hunedoara
Liga III: 2021–22

References

External links
 
 

1987 births
Living people
Sportspeople from Cluj-Napoca
Romanian footballers
Association football midfielders
Liga I players
Liga II players
Liga III players
Liga Leumit players
FC Universitatea Cluj players
ACS Sticla Arieșul Turda players
FC Politehnica Timișoara players
ASC Oțelul Galați players
FC Yenisey Krasnoyarsk players
FC Rapid București players
FC Dunărea Călărași players
ASA 2013 Târgu Mureș players
Hapoel Nir Ramat HaSharon F.C. players
FC Botoșani players
FC Astra Giurgiu players
LPS HD Clinceni players
CSM Reșița players
CS Corvinul Hunedoara players
Romanian expatriate footballers
Expatriate footballers in Russia
Romanian expatriate sportspeople in Russia
Expatriate footballers in Israel
Romanian expatriate sportspeople in Israel